Realia  may refer to:

 Realia (education), objects from real life used in classroom instruction
 Realia (library science), three-dimensional objects from real life that do not easily fit into the traditional categories of library material
 Realia, a disused name for a genus of molluscs, Liarea
 Realia (translation), words and expressions for culture-specific material things